{{DISPLAYTITLE:C8H10N4O3}}
The molecular formula C8H10N4O3 may refer to:

 Liberine
 1,3,7-Trimethyluric acid, also known as trimethyluric acid and 8-oxy-caffeine

Molecular formulas